The 1940 South Dakota gubernatorial election was held on November 5, 1940. Incumbent Republican Governor Harlan J. Bushfield sought re-election to a second term. After winning the Republican primary by a large margin, he faced Democrat Lewis W. Bicknell, former Day County State's Attorney, in the general election. Though Bushfield underperformed Republican presidential nominee Wendell Willkie, who won the state in a landslide, he nonetheless defeated Bicknell by a wide margin to easily win re-election.

Democratic Primary

Candidates
 Lewis W. Bicknell, former Day County State's Attorney, former Chairman of the State Department of Public Welfare, 1932 Democratic candidate for the U.S. Senate
 Almer O. Steensland, former State Representative from Charles Mix County

Results

Republican Primary

Candidates
 Harlan J. Bushfield, incumbent Governor
 Adolph N. Graff, former Mayor of Sioux Falls, South Dakota, former State Representative from Minnehaha County

Results

General election

Results

References

South Dakota
1940
Gubernatorial
November 1940 events